Anne-Liese of Dessau is a 1925 German silent historical film directed by James Bauer and starring Maly Delschaft, Werner Pittschau and Julia Serda. It portrays the life of Anna Louise Föhse.

The film's sets were designed by Robert A. Dietrich.

Cast
 Maly Delschaft
 Werner Pittschau
 Julia Serda
 Hermann Böttcher
 Fritz Richard
 Valy Arnheim
 Otto Reinwald
 Harry Grunwald
 Waldemar Potier

References

Bibliography

External links

1925 films
Films of the Weimar Republic
Films directed by James Bauer
German silent feature films
1920s historical films
German historical films
Films set in the 1690s
Films set in the 1700s
German black-and-white films
1920s German films